The Tucson Mavericks were a minor league professional ice hockey team in the Central Hockey League from 1975 to 1976.

The team was run by Head coach Adam Keller and General Manager Merle Miller.

Season results

References
azhockey.com
Hockeydb.com: Team information

Defunct Central Hockey League teams
Central Professional Hockey League teams
Ice hockey clubs established in 1975
Ice hockey clubs disestablished in 1976
1975 establishments in Arizona
1976 disestablishments in Arizona
Sports in Tucson, Arizona
Ice hockey teams in Arizona